Radis is a village and a former municipality in Wittenberg district in Saxony-Anhalt, Germany. Since 1 January 2010, it is part of the town Kemberg.

Geography 
Radis lies about 20 km southwest of Lutherstadt Wittenberg on the edge of the Düben Heath Nature Park.

History 
Radis was first documented in 1378 under the name Rodiß.

Culture and sightseeing 
The Papsthaus ("Pope House"), located in a wooded area about 2 km west of Radis, was where Johann Gottfried Galle (1812–1910) was born. With his startling discovery of the planet Neptune, among other things, he became one of Germany's most important astronomers.

Economy and transportation
Federal Highway (Bundesstraße) B 100 between Wittenberg and Gräfenhainichen runs right through the community. Radis railway station lies on the line between Wittenberg and Gräfenhainichen.

Notable residents 
Wilhelm Traugott Krug, philosopher
Johann Gottfried Galle, astronomer

External links 
Verwaltungsgemeinschaft's website

Former municipalities in Saxony-Anhalt
Kemberg